Cornubia City is a new mixed-use development which broke ground in 2012, north of Durban, South Africa between Phoenix, Ottawa, Mount Edgecombe and uMhlanga. The development project is a joint venture between the eThekwini Metropolitan Municipality and Tongaat Hulett. 482 homes were constructed in 2014 of the 24,000 residential units planned for the development; 15,000 of which will be low cost homes. A primary school opened 20 July 2015.

Cornubia is the first proposed sustainable and fully integrated human settlement in the region and has been declared a national priority project. It comprises , with  earmarked for industrial development and the remainder for commercial, housing and other social and public facilities including schools, clinics, police stations, post offices and multi-purpose halls. The projected completion date is 2030.

References 

Populated places in eThekwini Metropolitan Municipality